Derbyshire County Cricket Club in 1990 represents the cricket season when the English club Derbyshire  won the Refuge Assurance League winning twelve of their sixteen matches. The club  had been playing for one hundred and nineteen years. In the County Championship, they won six matches to  finish twelfth in their eighty-sixth season in the Championship. They were eliminated in round 2 of the  National Westminster Bank Trophy and at group level in the Benson & Hedges Cup.

1990 season

Derbyshire played 22 games in the County Championship, one match against Cambridge University and one match against the touring New Zealanders and won seven first class matches altogether. Kim Barnett was captain for his seventh  season. With dry conditions, the reduced size of the seam on the cricket ball and the extension of four-day cricket, the 1990 English cricket season was batsmen-friendly allowing them to build huge scores. Kim Barnett scored five centuries in the first class game and two in one-day events to make him top scorer. John Morris scored six centuries in first class and one in the one day game, and in both matches against Yorkshire three Derbyshire players made centuries. Ian Bishop took most wickets in the first class game at 59. Derbyshire had six wins in the championship but ended twelfth as on several occasions Barnett chose to make a (losing) game of it rather than playing for a draw. He declared against New Zealand on 30 for no wicket, declared at 250 behind against Leicestershire and chose not to play a second innings against Warwickshire. This emphasis on a faster game paid dividends in the Refuge Assurance League when Derbyshire won twelve matches to win the league for the first time. However they left both the Benson & Hedges Cup and the NWB Trophy in the early stages. Two Derbyshire records were set in the one day competitions. The opening partnership of Morris and Barnett against Somerset was a record 232 runs.  Against Hampshire they made their lowest score of 61.

Dominic Cork made his debut for the club playing one match in what was to be the first of many seasons. Zahid Sadiq also made his debut. Adrian Kuiper joined Derbyshire for the season.

Matches

First Class

Refuge Assurance League

National Westminster Bank Trophy

Benson and Hedges Cup
 

Derbyshire also played a one-day match against the Indians at Queen's Park, Chesterfield  on 16 Jul 1990, which India won by two wickets.

Statistics

Competition batting averages

Competition bowling averages

Wicket Keeping
KM Krikken
County Championship Catches 58, Stumping 3
Refuge Assurance League  Catches 2, Stumping 0

PD Bowler 
County Championship Catches 15, Stumping 0
Refuge Assurance League  Catches 22, Stumping 1
NWB Trophy Catches 3, Stumping 0 
B & H Trophy Catches 3, Stumping 1

See also
Derbyshire County Cricket Club seasons
1990 English cricket season

References

1990 in English cricket
Derbyshire County Cricket Club seasons